Adolfo José Valencia Mosquera (born 6 February 1968) is a Colombian retired footballer who played as a striker.

Nicknamed El tren (train) due to his powerful physique, he played in seven countries – having one-year spells in Germany and Spain's top flight – and represented Colombia at two World Cups.

Club career
Born in Buenaventura, Valle del Cauca, Valencia started playing with Independiente Santa Fe, where his stellar performances earned him a transfer to Germany's FC Bayern Munich. In his sole season (although he still played the first game of 1994–95), he was instrumental in helping the Bavarians clinch the Bundesliga title, and finished as the team's top scorer alongside Mehmet Scholl, with 11 goals.

Valencia also played one season in Spain, with Atlético Madrid, where he was involved in a serious incident with irascible club president Jesús Gil, while vastly underperforming overall: after a La Liga match at CD Logroñés, the latter said that "The black guy needs to have his throat cut". He subsequently went on to represent, without settling at any club, Independiente Santa Fe, América de Cali, A.C. Reggiana 1919, Independiente Medellín, PAOK FC, NY/NJ MetroStars, Zhejiang Lucheng F.C. and Unión Atlético Maracaibo.

While at Zhejiang, Valencia led the Chinese second division in scoring during the 2003 season. In his debut campaign in the Major League Soccer, he set a team record by scoring 16 league goals, and retired from football in 2004.

International career
Valencia made his debut for Colombia on 31 July 1992, scoring the only goal in a match against the United States at the Los Angeles Memorial Coliseum for the Friendship Cup, and proceeded to represent the nation at the 1994 and 1998 FIFA World Cups. In the former edition he netted twice, in group stage defeats to Romania and the United States.

Alongside Bernardo Redín, Valencia was Colombia's all-time topscorer in the World Cup. On 5 September 1993, he was one of three players on target in a 5–0 win in Argentina for the 1994 World Cup qualifiers.

International goals
Scores and results list Colombia's goal tally first.

Personal life
Valencia's son, José Adolfo, was also a footballer and a striker. He played mostly for Independiente Santa Fe, and represented Colombia at under-20 level.

Honours

Club
Bayern Munich
Bundesliga: 1993–94

América Cali
Categoría Primera A: 1997

Maracaibo
Venezuelan Primera División: 2003

References

External links

1968 births
Living people
People from Buenaventura, Valle del Cauca
Colombian footballers
Association football forwards
Categoría Primera A players
Independiente Santa Fe footballers
América de Cali footballers
Bundesliga players
FC Bayern Munich footballers
La Liga players
Atlético Madrid footballers
Serie A players
A.C. Reggiana 1919 players
Super League Greece players
PAOK FC players
Major League Soccer players
New York Red Bulls players
Major League Soccer All-Stars
China League One players
Zhejiang Professional F.C. players
UA Maracaibo players
Colombia international footballers
1994 FIFA World Cup players
1998 FIFA World Cup players
1993 Copa América players
Colombian expatriate footballers
Expatriate footballers in Germany
Expatriate footballers in Spain
Expatriate footballers in Italy
Expatriate footballers in Greece
Expatriate soccer players in the United States
Expatriate footballers in China
Expatriate footballers in Venezuela
Colombian expatriate sportspeople in Germany
Colombian expatriate sportspeople in Spain
Colombian people of African descent
Sportspeople from Valle del Cauca Department